The Meadow is an 1875 painting by Alfred Sisley, now in section 88 (French Impressionist landscapes) in the National Gallery of Art in Washington DC. It shows a scene near Louveciennes - Pierre-Auguste Renoir painted the same view of Louveciennes that year as Path Through Tall Herbs.

It is described in the catalogue of count Armand Doria's collection as:
 
It was sold from Doria's collection at the Georges Petit gallery on 4–5 May 1899 as catalogue number 224. It was bought by Durand-Ruel, before being sold again in 1900 via Bernheim-Jeune to Jules Strauss (1861-1943).

It was sold from Strauss' collection as catalogue number 60 on 3 May 1902 to Joubert, possibly on behalf of the Georges Petit gallery. In 1933 it was acquired by senator Antonio Santamarina of Buenos Aires in 1933. In 1957 it was sold to the Wildenstein & Co Gallery, which sold it on 4 October that year to Ailsa Mellon Bruce. In 1970 she left it to its present owner.

References 

1875 paintings
Paintings by Alfred Sisley
Collections of the National Gallery of Art